Arnica mallotopus is a species of flowering plant in the family Asteraceae. It is native to Japan.

References

mallotopus
Flora of Japan